The 2022 UK Seniors Championship was a seniors' snooker tournament that took place from 4 to 7 January 2022 at the Bonus Arena in Hull, England. It was the first World Seniors Tour event of the 2021–22 snooker season.

Michael Judge was the defending champion, having defeated Jimmy White 4–2 in the 2019 edition of the event. However, Judge lost 1–3 to Peter Lines in the first round. Lines went on to win the tournament, beating David Lilley 4–1 in the final.

The tournament was the final event in which 1980 World Champion and three-time Masters champion Cliff Thorburn competed. He played his final match against Kuldesh Johal on 5 January 2022, eleven days before turning 74.

Tournament draw 
Below are the results for the main draw. Seedings are shown in the leftmost boxes, and match winners are denoted in bold.

Final

Century breaks 
A total of 2 century breaks were made during the tournament.
 109  David Lilley
 102  Wayne Cooper

References

World Seniors Tour
2022 in snooker
2022 in English sport
Snooker competitions in England
January 2022 sports events in the United Kingdom
2020s in Kingston upon Hull
Sport in Kingston upon Hull